Kjell Johansson (born 12 February 1951) is a former tennis player from Sweden.

Johansson turned professional in 1974. He won one singles title (12 March 1978, Lagos) during his career and reached his highest individual ranking on the ATP Tour on 21 August 1978, when he became world number 32.

He represented Sweden in the Davis Cup in 1973, 1976, 1977, 1978, 1979, 1980 and 1981.

Career finals

Singles (1 titles, 3 runner-ups)

Doubles (1 runner-up)

References

External links
 
 

1951 births
Living people
Swedish male tennis players
People from Borås Municipality
Sportspeople from Västra Götaland County